Middlesex County Council under the Local Government Act 1888 had to be returned by local elections every three years.  Its first election was in January 1889, the year the council first met.  The last was in 1961 as the 1964 elections instead were – as to 83 of 87 divisions – for the larger, in-waiting Greater London Council – 4 divisions went into other counties, on abolition.  Three intra-war elections were never announced and formally cancelled but otherwise expected in 1916, 1940 and 1943.

The much more urban minority of the county had been directed by Parliament to co-form the County – and thus area of that separate County Council – of London in 1889.  

Political make-up split into three periods, each one shorter than the last. The first period of local political preferences of 45 years saw victories somewhat reliant on independents and Liberals, but quite concertedly anti-socialist councillors, many or most of whom Conservatives.  The second period saw a knife-edge marginal "swing chamber" or "swing county council".  In 1958 voters were more socialist than bellwethers, defying the nation's popular and electoral outcome of the next year.  Politically wavering and/or new Middlesex voters across a decisive 15 of 87 electoral districts returned to the Conservatives three years later but the 1958 result presaged the second clear ascendancy of the Labour Party.  Labour went on immediately after the county's administrative demise to success in the form of the First and Second Wilson ministries and a string of successes in the enlarged London.

20th century growth in housing and population
Middlesex considerably urbanised – whereas the population of London after 1911 fell, in favour of commercial property and the clearance of slum, overcrowded and war-damaged housing.   The number of Middlesex homes, an area static in size, rose from 236,266 to 665,347 in the forty years to 1961.

The county's conserved, suburban character over the Council's lifetime changed.  By 1958 it is clear the bulk of the population could not be seen as core base "Villa Tory" shopkeepers, merchants, finance sector workers, and business owners.  New homes dominated Wembley, Harrow, Hendon, Southgate, Enfield, Feltham, Staines, Twickenham, Uxbridge, Ruislip and north Ealing districts.  New factories and warehouses employed tens of thousands in Brentford, Perivale, Greenford, Heston, Harmondsworth and West Drayton. This contrasts with the prior drawing-up of the territory that seized on a decades-earlier definition of the 'capital's metropolis' as the County of London. In new, or rump, Middlesex this "cracked" i.e. pitched the social bulk of voters against heavily working class Acton, Tottenham and Edmonton to form the 1889 definition of the county. The urbanisation flowed equally from swathes of non-state-assisted housing built as much as from the London Blitz, post-war rationing, poverty, general austerity and so central edicts and incentives from the Ministry of Housing to provide social housing. Across these divisions the quickly-built housing became equivalent to a large, de facto, New Town for residents displaced by the destruction of London homes and communities – the number of homes multiplied by 2.8 in the forty years mentioned.

1889 – 1919
The first elections were held in January 1889. The Times noted that, in contrast to most counties where a large of number of seats were uncontested, contests took place in nearly every electoral division.

The first meeting of the "provisional" county council was held on 14 February 1889 at Westminster Town Hall. The council did not use political labels but among the aldermen elected were three Liberal-leaning peers: balanced with three Conservative MPs. Four of the six held large houses with over  liable to much of the local rates thus assumed to be involved in local interests, in the highly suburban small county. Three of these were manor houses so the owners would have been summoned to Hundred Courts the council replaced.

This body appointed an Apportionment Committee to liaise with the London County Council to apportion between the two bodies the old central meeting halls and other civic properties and responsibilities. It was decided to seek Middlesex Guildhall, Westminster, as the headquarters of the county council (extra-territorial but convenient to local-line terminus railway stations). The justices of the peace for Middlesex met to consider county business for the last time on 28 March 1889 at the Sessions House, Clerkenwell. The Sessions House duly passed to the London County Council, and Middlesex County Council came into official existence on 1 April 1889.

1919 – 1946
The triennial elections were suspended for the duration of the First World War, and when polling was held on 8 March 1919 there was a vigorous campaign centred on the issue of the Sunday opening of cinemas. The Cinematograph Exhibitors Association supported 16 candidates, including members of the Labour Party, who gained their first seats on the council. The 1922 and 1925 elections were, for the most part, not run on party lines. The Times noted that it was "impossible to separate the candidates into different classes, and the contests are run much more upon local considerations than any widespread policy labelled throughout the county". The size of the council was increased in that year from 80 members (60 councillors and 20 aldermen) to 98 (74 councillors and 24 aldermen). The majority of the members of the county council continued not to bear party labels. In 1928 the majority of the council were described as "Moderate", with Labour forming an opposition. Labour continued to make advances at the 1931 election, and this led to the formation of a Middlesex Municipal Association "representative of all anti-Socialist members". The association was supported by the various Conservative Party organisations of the county although it was not officially affiliated to the party.

The number of councillors rose at the 1934 and 1937 elections.

1952 – 1955

The boundaries of many electoral divisions were altered, with effect from elections of 3 April 1952. Their number, corresponding to that of councillors was reduced to 87, from 90. 

The Conservatives retained control with 44 seats (a loss of 9) to Labour's 43 (a gain of 10). The only incumbent Independent was defeated. At the aldermanic elections, the Conservatives took 11 out of 14, levering their slender majority, against protests by the Labour group. Comparing the below tier of local government, Municipal Borough of Heston and Isleworth split into the county's electoral divisions: Heston & Cranford, Hounslow Central, Hounslow West, and Isleworth – the other divisions shared all or part of their name with their more local (lower tier) authority.

1955 – 1958

Some boundaries of electoral divisions were altered for the elections held on 31 March 1955. The number of these and thus councillors remained 87. Conservatives increased their majority on the council, winning 50 seats, against Labour's 37. Three Conservatives were elected unopposed.

1958 – 1961

In the elections held on 16 April 1958, Labour (with 47 councillors) gained control from the Conservatives (with 39 councillors) and Finchley East's councillor was Liberal.

1961 – 1965

On 13 April 1961 voters sent a majority of Conservatives to form the council: 55 out of 87, a gain of 15 seat from Labour and the Liberal seat. These became the final elections to the county council: under the London Government Act 1963 the next ones took place instead primarily for Greater London Council.

Notes and References

Notes

Citations

Council elections in South East England
History of local government in Middlesex
Political history of Middlesex
County council elections in England